Millbrook is an unincorporated community in Cole County, in the U.S. state of Missouri.

History
A post office called Millbrook was established in 1893, and remained in operation until 1911. The community was named from a gristmill on a nearby brook.

References

Unincorporated communities in Cole County, Missouri
Unincorporated communities in Missouri
Jefferson City metropolitan area